The following is a list of people executed by the U.S. state of Pennsylvania.

A total of 1,043 people have been executed in Pennsylvania since 1693, the third highest of any other state or commonwealth in the Union, after New York (1,130) and Virginia (1,361).

Until 1915, hanging was the common method of execution. 1915 saw the first use of the electric chair, even though it was approved by the Pennsylvania General Assembly in 1913. The delay was due to the time needed to finish the Western Penitentiary in Centre County, now the State Correctional Institution – Rockview. On November 29, 1990, Governor Casey changed the form of execution to lethal injection.

The last person to be publicly executed in Pennsylvania was Charles Getter, who was hanged on Getter's Island on January 11, 1833.

After 1976
Since the reinstatement of the death penalty by the U.S. Supreme Court in 1976, 3 men, all convicted of murder, have been executed by the Commonwealth of Pennsylvania. All were executed by lethal injection, and in all cases, they waived their appeals and asked that the execution be carried out.

See also
 Capital punishment in Pennsylvania
 Capital punishment in the United States

References

Pennsylvania
People executed